Anti-LGBT discrimination encompasses the following topics:
Homophobia
Biphobia
Lesbophobia
Transphobia
Transmisogyny
Discrimination against transgender men
Transgender inequality
Discrimination against non-binary people
Discrimination against asexual people
Discrimination against gay men
Discrimination against intersex people
Heterosexism
Heteronormativity
Violence against LGBT people
Gay bashing
Trans bashing
Homophobic propaganda
Anti-LGBT rhetoric

See also
Discrimination against LGBT people